Winners of the West can refer to two separate Universal film serials:

 Winners of the West (1921 serial), early silent serial
 Winners of the West (1940 serial), sound serial